Frederick Rumball Nicholls  (born October 11, 1950) is a former Canadian politician who sat in the Legislative Assembly of Ontario from 2011 to 2022. He represented the riding of Chatham-Kent—Leamington. 

Nicholls was originally a member of the Progressive Conservative (PC) Party before he was removed in 2021 due to vaccine hesitancy. In December 2021, he joined the Ontario Party, becoming its first and only member in the legislature until losing his seat in the 2022 election.

Background 
Nicholls was born in Chatham-Kent, Ontario. He attended St. Clair College and the University of Windsor. His great-great-grandfather, Frederick George Rumball, was the mayor of London, Ontario from 1900 to 1901. Amongst his political heroes is former US president Ronald Reagan.

Nicholls was the founder of Nicholls Training Group, a training and development company. His clients included the Canadian Embassy to the United Nations, Canada Post and Ford Motor Company of Canada. He and his wife Dianne live in Chatham-Kent where they raised three children, including singer/songwriter Brooke Nicholls.

Political career 
Nicholls ran in the 2011 Ontario general election as the Progressive Conservative candidate in the riding of Chatham-Kent—Essex.

While serving in the Official Opposition from 2011 to 2018, Nicholls served 4 years as the Opposition’s Shadow Cabinet in Community Safety and Correctional Services. Since the 2018 election and until 2022, he served as the Government Deputy Speaker of the Ontario Legislative Assembly.

Nicholls is an outspoken opponent of wind turbines. Citing unproven health hazards of wind turbines, he has called for a moratorium on their construction.

In 2012, Nicholls called for a more thorough investigation into a massive fish kill incident along the shores of Lake Erie in early September 2012.

He was re-elected in the 2014 election. Where he was the party's critic for Tourism, Culture, and Sport as well as Community Safety and Correctional Services.

In 2015, during a debate about the province's new sexual education curriculum, Nicholls revealed that he does not believe in evolution, and he was not kidding when he said it was "not a bad idea" to stop teaching it in schools. His stance was met with criticism from other members of the PC Party.

Following the 2018 election, Nicholls served as Deputy Speaker of the House. He was also on the Caucus Advisory Teams for Corrections and Community Safety, Ministry of the Attorney General, and the Ministry of Children, Community, and Social Services.

Dismissal from Ontario Progressive Conservative caucus 
Nicholls was ejected from the caucus by Premier Doug Ford on August 19, 2021, after refusing to get a COVID-19 vaccine, against the policy made by the party. Nicholls cited personal reasons for his vaccine hesitancy.  On October 5, 2021, he was removed from his role as deputy speaker, and announced that he would not seek re-election when his term expires in 2022.

In December 2021, Nicholls joined the Ontario Party to become its first sitting member in the Legislative Assembly.

References

External links 

 
 
 Nicholls Training Group

1951 births
Living people
People from Chatham-Kent
Progressive Conservative Party of Ontario MPPs
21st-century Canadian politicians
Politicians affected by a party expulsion process
Ontario Party MPPs